Pavel Potsev Shatev  (Bulgarian and ) (July 15, 1882 – January 30, 1951) was a Macedonian Bulgarian revolutionary and member of the left wing of the Internal Macedonian-Adrianople Revolutionary Organization (IMARO), later becoming a left-wing political activist. He was a self-declared Bulgarian and was jailed in post-WWII SR Macedonia as an enemy of the state.

Biography
Born in Kratovo, in the Kosovo Vilayet of the Ottoman Empire (present-day North Macedonia), Shatev graduated from the Bulgarian Men's High School of Thessaloniki. At first he participated in a group that made plans for a bomb attack in Istanbul. In 1900 the Ottoman police arrested the whole group, including Shatev. In 1901 the prisoners were deported το Bulgaria, after pressure from the Bulgarian government, where they consulted with members of a small anarchist group in Salonika, who agreed to blow up the local branch of the Ottoman Bank. In late April 1903, together with a group of young anarchists from the Gemidzhii Circle, he launched a campaign of terror bombing known as the Thessaloniki bombings of 1903. He used dynamite to blow up the French ship "Guadalquivir" which was leaving Thessaloniki harbour. He was captured and sentenced to death, but later his sentence was changed to life imprisonment in Fezzan in modern-day Libya.

In 1908, after the Young Turks revolution, Shatev was given amnesty, went to Bulgaria and graduated in law at Sofia University. In the next few years he worked as a teacher and journalist. In 1912 Shatev was appointed a teacher in Thessaloniki Bulgarian Men's High school and witnessed its destruction by Greek troops on June 18, 1913 during the Second Balkan War. He participated as a Bulgarian soldier in the First World War. During the 1920s Shatev became a member of the Macedonian Federative Organisation but after the coup in 1923, he emigrated from Sofia to Vienna. Here he get in contact with the Soviet Embassy and was recruited as a Soviet spy and Comintern activist. In 1925, Shatev was one of the founders of Comintern sponsored IMRO (United) in Vienna, but later he was disappointed with its activity and moved to Istanbul. There he founded another offshoot of IMRO (United). In the early 1930s, he went back to Bulgaria and worked as a lawyer and publicist. After the beginning of World War II, he was engaged in Communist conspiracy. As this was considered a political offence, he was arrested in Sofia and sentenced to 15 years of prison.

After the end of the war, Shatev was released and took part in the creation of the new People's Republic of Macedonia as a member of ASNOM. He was elected Minister of Justice in the first communist government and later became vice-chairman of the Presidium of ASNOM. After the first elections for parliament, Shatev became a deputy.  Nevertheless, such Macedonian activists, who came from the IMRO (United) and the Bulgarian Communist Party never managed to get rid of their bulgarophile bias.

Meanwhile, from the start of the new Yugoslavia, the authorities organised frequent purges and trials of Macedonian communists and non-party people charged with autonomist deviation. Many of the former left-wing IMRO government officials were purged from their positions, then isolated, arrested, imprisoned or executed on various charges including pro-Bulgarian leanings, demands for greater independence of Yugoslav Macedonia, collaboration with the Cominform after the Tito–Stalin split in 1948, and the like. In 1946 Shatev wrote a complaint to the Bulgarian embassy in Belgrade, in which he argued that the new Macedonian language is Serbianized and the use of Bulgarian language is prohibited in Macedonia and required the intervention of the Bulgarian leader Georgi Dimitrov.

In 1948, fully disappointed with the policy of the new Yugoslav authorities, Shatev, together with Panko Brashnarov, complained in letters to Joseph Stalin and to Georgi Dimitrov and asked for help, maintaining better relations with Bulgaria and the Soviet Union. As a result, he was jailed for his pro-Bulgarian and anti-Tito sympathies for a one year. After that, Shatev was taken into home custody in Bitola. On January 30, 1951, his dead body was found on Bitola's dung-hill.

Literature
 "В Македония под Робство; Солунското Съзаклятие (1903 г.), Подготовка и Изпълнение" "In Macedonia under Slavery", first edition of the popular Pavel Shatev book.
 "Бележки върху Българската Просвета в Македония", публикувана в "Сборник Солун", София 1934 година Pavel Shatev on the Bulgarian enlightenment in Macedonia and the last days of the Bulgarian schools in Salonica.

References

1882 births
1951 deaths
People from Kratovo, North Macedonia
People from Kosovo vilayet
Bulgarian revolutionaries
Bulgarian military personnel of World War I
Government ministers of Yugoslavia
Bulgarian emigrants to Yugoslavia
Members of the Macedonian Scientific Institute
Members of the Internal Macedonian Revolutionary Organization
Internal Macedonian Revolutionary Organization (United) members
Bulgarian educators
Macedonian Bulgarians
Bulgarian Men's High School of Thessaloniki alumni
Bulgarian people imprisoned abroad
Prisoners and detainees of the Ottoman Empire
Prisoners and detainees of Yugoslavia
Bulgarian anarchists